The Interstate Highways in the state of Florida are owned and maintained by the Florida Department of Transportation (FDOT). There are four primary interstate highways and eight auxiliary highways, with a ninth proposed, totaling  interstate miles in Florida. The longest interstate is I-75, extending , and the shortest is I-395, extending just .


Primary Interstates

Auxiliary Interstates

References

Interstate Highways